The Battle of Jaji was fought during the Soviet–Afghan War between Soviet Army units, and their allies of the Democratic Republic of Afghanistan against Afghan mujahideen groups in Paktia Province. This battle occurred in April 1987, during the first stage of withdrawal of Soviet forces from Afghanistan. The objective was to relieve a besieged garrison at Ali Sher, and cut off supply lines to the Mujahideen from Pakistan.

The battle
The Mujahideen al-Masada ("Lion's Den") compound had been constructed by Osama bin Laden, in order to have a training facility that didn't rely on Pakistan. On April 17, after Ali Sher had been relieved, Jaji was attacked by approximately 200 Soviet Airborne Troops, Spetsnaz, the Soviet-backed Afghan Army and tribal militias.

The Mujahideen army was estimated from as low as 50 members, to numbering "in the thousands", having drawn recruits from the surrounding area, including forces from all seven of the resistance parties. Among the leaders were Jalaluddin Haqqani and Mohammed Anwar, whose experienced troops were carrying Stinger and Blowpipe missiles that threatened Soviet gunships. Enaam Arnaout also participated, identifying himself to Arab press as "Abu Mahmoud, from Syria", and he was photographed alongside Bin Laden and quoted as saying that the Soviets had dropped napalm, destroying the trees that the Mujahideen had hoped to use for fortifications. Essam al-Ridi, an American who participated in the battle, later claimed that as many as 50 Mujahideen had been killed and only two Soviets, disillusioning him. During the battle, Abu Ubaidah al-Banshiri and Mohammed Atef both led raids which encircled the Soviet siege, ambushing them outside the encampment, al-Banshiri being shot in the leg during one excursion.

Others participating in the battle included Abdullah Azzam and his son Hutaifa, Abu Khalil who was in charge of keeping up a steady barrage of mortars, Tamim al-Adnani and a figure called as "Abu al-Hasan" tenatively identified as Wael Julaidan. Abu Zaheb and Khaled el Kerde were both killed in the battle.

On May 29, the "Battle of 1 Shawwal" was part of the larger action; Russian commandos entered the Msada compound but were repelled by a group of 25 Arabs with a handful of Afghan supporters. In the heat of the battle, there were only nine defenders alive—but the Soviets did not realise the weakness until after reinforcements arrived.

This battle later became famous due to the participation of bin Laden, whose force of 50 Arabs fought alongside the Afghan rebels. However, bin Laden and his fighters were ordered to abandon the position to their Afghan allies after taking losses. 

At least 50 of the Arab volunteers and about 70 Afghans were killed in the week-long battle, and bin Laden suffered a foot wound. Ahmed Khadr would often praise the bravery of the fighters in Jaji to his children, but refused to confirm whether or not he had actually participated.

In the end, the Mujahideen successfully held their complex system of tunnels and caves named al-Masada just outside the village of Jaji, near the Pakistani border, from Soviet capture.

Significance
Although relatively unimportant in military terms, the battle had been chronicled daily by Jamal Khashoggi, a Saudi journalist, and his reporting in Al Majalla and in Arab News left an impression of bin Laden as a victorious military leader and attracted a number of followers to his cause.

References

 Jihad magazine, "With our four automobiles against the Warsaw Pact", Issue 31, June 1987

Jaji
Jaji
Jaji
Jaji
History of Paktia Province
1987 in Afghanistan
Massacres in Afghanistan